Fischer is an unincorporated community in Comal County, Texas, United States. The population was 688 at the 2010 census. The community is a part of the Texas-German Belt which runs from Schulenburg in the east, and west through the Hill Country to Fredericksburg. Most residents of Fischer have German-Texan ancestry, and the name Fischer is named after Otto and Hermann Fischer, German immigrants.

Fischer has a post office with the ZIP code 78623.

History
Fischer was founded in 1853 by Hermann and Otto Fischer, German immigrants.  They established a self-sufficient rural community based on agriculture and ranching, economic activities that continue in the area.  The center of the community around the historic Fischer Store and post office.  One of the surviving early 20th-century buildings in town includes an old nine-pin bowling alley whose pins are still set by hand. The town also includes a dance hall and a one room school house. The core of the village, as well as its surrounding landscape and transportation patterns, were listed on the National Register of Historic Places in 2017 as the Fischer Historic District.

Climate
The climate in this area is characterized by hot, humid summers and generally mild to cool winters.  According to the Köppen Climate Classification system, Fischer has a humid subtropical climate, abbreviated "Cfa" on climate maps.

Education
Residents are zoned to the Comal Independent School District

Zoned schools:
 Mountain Valley and Rebecca Creek elementaries
 Mountain Valley Middle School
 Canyon Lake High School

See also

National Register of Historic Places listings in Comal County, Texas

References

External links

Unincorporated communities in Comal County, Texas
Unincorporated communities in Texas
Greater San Antonio
Historic districts in Texas
National Register of Historic Places in Comal County, Texas